Lonsdale Energy Corporation or LEC is a wholly owned city of North Vancouver corporation working in partnership with Terasen Utility Services to deliver energy services to the Lower Lonsdale area of North Vancouver since 2003. It has received $8 million in government and private sector funding. Green Municipal Funds, endowed by the Government of Canada and administered by the Federation of Canadian Municipalities, support the project with a $2 million low-interest loan and a $2 million grant. Terasen Utility Services and the municipality are each providing $2 million.

The district energy system will produce hot water at a series of mini-plants within Lower Lonsdale
and then distribute the hot water energy through underground pipes to buildings connected to the
system. Once used in the connected buildings, the water is returned to a mini-plant, reheated and
circulated back to the connected buildings.

References

Companies based in North Vancouver